John Fiske Brown (June 13, 1901 – May 30, 1978) was an American athlete who participated in American football, wrestling and track and field.  He was a competitor in all three sports at Harvard University and a consensus All-American in football.

Brown was raised in Plymouth, Massachusetts, and attended preparatory school at Andover where he was a member of the football, wrestling and track teams.

As a guard for the Harvard Crimson football team, Browne was a consensus first-team selection for the 1921 College Football All-America Team.  He was also captain of Harvard's wrestling team and a competitor in the heavyweight class.  He was also the captain of the track and field team and a competitor in the shot put and hammer throw events. He set a record in the hammer throw for international meets between Yale, Harvard, Oxford and Cambridge with a distance of 159 feet, 4-3/4 inches.

References

1901 births
1978 deaths
American football guards
Harvard Crimson football players
All-American college football players
Players of American football from Massachusetts
People from Plymouth, Massachusetts
Sportspeople from Plymouth County, Massachusetts